The classical sculptures in the Farnese Collection, one aspect of this large art collection, are one of the first collections of artistic items from Greco-Roman Antiquity. It includes some of the most influential classical works, including the sculptures that were part of the Farnese Marbles, their collection of statuary, which includes world-famous works like the Farnese Hercules, Farnese Cup, Farnese Bull and the Farnese Atlas. These statues are now displayed in the Naples National Archaeological Museum in Italy with some in the British Museum in London.

History

The items in the collection were acquired or requisitioned by Cardinal Alessandro Farnese, who became Pope Paul III (1534 - 1549). Classical artworks were routinely uncovered in Roman lands, and during the Italian Renaissance had become much desired. Many were family heirlooms of prominent families in Rome. Alessandro purchased the Sassi and Bernardino Fabio collections, confiscated the Colonna collection, and received the collection of Cardinal Federico Cesi as a donation. Other works were bought in the antiques market, including works that were appearing as part of excavations and construction throughout the city. Michelangelo had designed internal niches to display statuary in the massive Palazzo Farnese (1546) in Rome.

Many of the most famous works in the Farnese collection, such as the Farnese Hercules and the Farnese Bull, Flora, Gladiator, Athena, and others were all found at the Baths of Caracalla.

The Farnese collection was further enlarged by the Pope's nephew, another Cardinal Alessandro, by the purchase of the Del Bufalo and Cesarini collections. It also included the inheritance left in 1587 by Margaret of Parma, the widow first of Alessandro de Medici and then of Ottavio Farnese. She also possessed a collection of famous engraved gems, which formerly belonged to Lorenzo dei Medici, including the Farnese Cup, and important marble sculptures such as the Pergamene statues.

The Farnese’s trusted collector and antiquarian Fulvio Orsini aided in shopping for other works and on his death, left his collection of gems, coins and busts to Odoardo Farnese. Among the works were two statues of Hercules and two statues of Flora; the two Gladiators were placed beneath the arches of the courtyard of the Palazzo; while the Farnese Bull was placed in a special enclosure in the second courtyard.

Display
Inside ancient statues were arranged according to themes within the Farnese Palace. In the Gran Salone, the Sala degli Imperatori, the Sala dei Filosofi and the Galleria dei Carracci were valuable marbles. The Annibale Carracci ceiling frescoes depicting The Loves of the Gods were painted not only to celebrate a wedding, but also commented on statuary in the niches below the frescoes.

Move to Naples

The Farnese family, who had become Dukes of Parma lost its last male heir upon the death of Antonio Farnese of Parma, and thus the collection passed through Elisabetta Farnese, who married King Philip V of Spain, to their son Charles of Bourbon, who became king of Naples and the Two Sicilies in 1734. He then decided to move the Parmesan collections to Naples. His son Ferdinand IV of Naples brought the Roman collections to Naples in 1787, despite the strong opposition of the Papacy. Many of the marble sculptures were restored by Carlo Albacini (1735-1813). 

The classical sculptures of the Farnese collections are still exhibited together at the National Archaeological Museum of Naples. Most of the paintings, on the other hand, have been moved to the Museo di Capodimonte, also in Naples, with some other works from the collections moved to the museo civico and Collegio Alberoni of Piacenza, the Galleria Nazionale of Parma, and the British Museum.

Famous items from the Farnese collection

The collection contains many copies of ancient Greek originals, and provides a broad review of classic Roman sculpture. Among the prizes of the collection are:
 Farnese Hercules (Naples National Archaeological Museum)
 Farnese Cup (Naples National Archaeological Museum)
 Farnese Bull (Naples National Archaeological Museum)
 Farnese Flora (Naples National Archaeological Museum) 
 Farnese Gladiator (Naples National Archaeological Museum) 
 Venus Kallipygos (Naples National Archaeological Museum) 
 Farnese Atlas (Naples National Archaeological Museum) 
 Farnese Athena (Naples National Archaeological Museum) 
 Farneses Hermes (British Museum)
 Farnese Diadumenos (British Museum)

See also
 Townley collection

References

External links
 Naples National Archeological Museum website

2nd-century BC works
 
Collections of the National Archaeological Museum, Naples
Collections of the Museo di Capodimonte
Royal Palace of Naples
Hellenistic sculpture